= Umnaka =

- Town
- Location within Pakistan
- Coordinates: 33.19°N 73.19°E
- Country: Pakistan
- Province: (Islamabad Capital Territory) Islamabad C.T
- Elevation: 456 m (1,496 ft)

Population
  - Total: 17,535
- Time zone: UTC+5 (PST)

Umnaka is a town in the Islamabad Capital Territory of Pakistan. It is located at 33° 19' 15N 73° 19' 25E with an altitude of 456 metres (1499 feet).
